Scheid (often spelled Scheidt) is a German surname. The surname Scheid was first found in the Rhineland of western Germany.  It is dispersed across Germany and former Prussian area.  Immigrants to America have often changed the spelling to variations like Shade.

Notable people with the surname include:

Bernhard Scheid Austrian historian
Eusébio Scheid (born 1932), Brazilian Cardinal Priest and Archbishop of Rio de Janeiro
Linda Scheid (1942–2011), American politician
Richard Scheid (1876–1962), Bavarian author, unionist and USPD politician
Edward Scheidt (born 1939), American cryptographer and ex-Chairman of the CIA Cryptographic Center
Gottfried Scheidt (1593–1661), German Baroque composer and brother of Samuel Scheidt
Hans-Wilhelm Scheidt (1907-1981), German Nazi official
Mathias Scheidt, Archbishop of Vienna (1490–1493)
Mike Scheidt, American metal vocalist
Rafael Scheidt (born 1976), Brazilian footballer
Robert Scheidt (born 1973), Brazilian sailor
Samuel Scheidt (1587–1654), German Baroque composer and brother of Gottfried Scheidt
Lords von Scheidt genannt Weschpfennig, a German noble family
Nick Sheedy (1974- ), Lead Genealogist for the PBS television show Finding Your Roots traces his paternal lineage back to a German Scheid(t) family in West Prussia.

References

German-language surnames